Isthomosacanthidae is a family of parasitic spiny-headed (or thorny-headed) worms.

Species
Isthomosacanthidae contains the following genera and species:

Golvanorhynchus Noronha, Fabio & Pinto, 1978
 Golvanorhynchus golvani Noronha, Fabio & Magalhaes, 1978
G. golvani was found parasitizing the Atlantic chub mackerel (Scomber colias).

Gorgorhynchoides Cable and Linderoth, 1963
Gorgorhynchoides bullocki Cable and Mafarachisi, 1970	 
Gorgorhynchoides cablei (Gupta and Fatma, 1987)
Gorgorhynchoides cribbi Smales, 2014
Gorgorhynchoides elongatus Cable and Linderoth, 1963	 
Gorgorhynchoides epinepheli Wang, 1986
Gorgorhynchoides gnathanodontos Smales, 2014 
Gorgorhynchoides golvani (Chandra, Hanumantha-Rao and Shyamasundari, 1984)	 
Gorgorhynchoides indicus Bhattacharya and Banerjee, 2003
Gorgorhynchoides lintoni Cable and Mafarachisi, 1970
Gorgorhynchoides orientalis (Wang, 1966)
Gorgorhynchoides queenslandensis Smales, 2014
Gorgorhynchoides valiyathurae (Nadakal, John and Jacob, 1990)
Serrasentis Van Cleave, 1923

Serrasentis engraulisi Gupta & Gupta, 1980
Serrasentis fotedari Gupta & Fatma, 1980
Serrasentis golvani Gupta & Kumar, 1987
Serrasentis lamelliger (Diesing, 1854)
Serrasentis manazo Bilqees & Khan, 2005
Serrasentis mujibi Bilqees, 1972
Serrasentis nadakali George & Nadakal, 1978
Serrasentis niger Kahatoon and Bilqees, 2007
Serrasentis psenesi Gupta & Gupta, 1980
Serrasentis sagittifer (Linton, 1889)
Serrasentis sauridae Surekha and Vijayalakshmi, 2006
Serrasentis sciaenus Bilqees, 1972
Serrasentis sidaroszakaio Tadros, Iskandar & Wassef, 1979

Hosts
Isthomosacanthidae  species parasitize fish hosts.

Notes

References

Polymorphida
Acanthocephala families